Roger Federer defeated Tomáš Berdych in the final, 3–6, 7–5, 7–5 to win the men's singles tennis title at the 2012 Madrid Open. With the win, Federer won his record-tying 20th Masters title and third title at Madrid.

Novak Djokovic was the defending champion, but lost to Janko Tipsarević in the quarterfinals.

This was the first and only edition of the tournament to be held on blue clay courts.

Seeds
The top eight seeds receive a bye into the second round.

Draw

Finals

Top half

Section 1

Section 2

Bottom half

Section 3

Section 4

Qualifying

Seeds

Qualifiers

Qualifying draw

First qualifier

Second qualifier

Third qualifier

Fourth qualifier

Fifth qualifier

Sixth qualifier

Seventh qualifier

External links
Main Draw
Qualifying Draw

Men's Singles